Kavali is a village under Santhakavati mandal in Srikakulam district, Andhra Pradesh, India. Kavali Pratibha Bharati, better known as K. Pratibha Bharati - the former Speaker of Andhra Pradesh Legislative Assembly was born here in this village and also takes it as her family name.

Demographics
 Indian census, the demographic details of this village is as follows:
 Total Population: 	886 in 203 Households.
 Male Population: 	452
 Female Population: 	434
 Children Under 6-years: 94 (Boys - 46 and Girls - 48)
 Total Literates: 	495

References

Villages in Srikakulam district